Kanika Banerjee (12 October 1924 – 5 April 2000) was an Bengali Rabindra Sangeet singer.

Biography

Early life
Born on 12 October 1924 at Sonamukhi in Bankura district, Kanika joined Visva-Bharati University, Santiniketan in West Bengal, India.  She was trained in both classical and Rabindrasangeet in Sangeet Bhavana (School of Music) at Santiniketan. Shantiniketan (which literally means Abode of Peace) was built on the model of an Ashram (educational hermitage). For this reason, Kanika is also occasionally referred to as Ashram Kanya or 'girl of the Ashram'. She was fortunate to take music lessons from none other than Rabindranath Tagore. It was Tagore who named her Kanika (her original name being Anima), also the name of one of his books on Poetry. Her other gurus were Dinendra Nath Tagore, Sailajaranjan Majumdar, Indira Devi Chaudhurani and Santidev Ghosh. She participated in dance-dramas directed by Rabindranath and toured all over India as a member of his cultural troupe.

Career
Kanika Bandyopadhyay joined Sangit Bhavana as a teacher and in due course became Head of the Department of Rabindrasangeet and later its Principal. She was made Professor Emeritus of Visva-Bharati.

Since 1943, Kanika had been a regular artiste of the Calcutta station of All India Radio and gave performances at the national level in the musical programmes arranged by other stations as honoured artiste. Her gramophone records came out even in the lifetime of the Poet (Tagore) and there are over 300 gramophone discs to her credit. She was also a singer of Bhajans, Nazrulgeeti (songs by Kazi Nazrul Islam) and Atulprasad's songs. However the first song recorded by her was neither a Tagore song nor a Nazrul Geeti but a Bengali Adhunik song composed by Niharbindu Sen.

Kanika was invited to sing by programme organizers not only in India but also in Europe and America and was acclaimed everywhere for her unique rendering of the subtle nuances of emotions expressed in Rabindranath's lyrical compositions. She has written three books on this genre. Her life has been well documented on film by noted film directors. She was associated with the Elmhirst Institute of Community Studies during the last years of her life.

She received the highest accolade from Visva-Bharati University, the Desikottama.

Awards and accolades
In appreciation of her outstanding contribution to Rabindra Sangeet she was awarded the Gold Disc of the Gramophone Company of India in 1980. She received the best Bengali playback singer award from the Bengal Film Journalists’ Association in 1973. Kanika bagged the Sangeet Natak Akademi Award for the year of 1979. In 1986, she received Padma Shri award from the Government of India. Her Alma Mater (also home turf)  Vishva-Bharati University,  bestowed upon her Desikottama, its highest award in 1997.

Death
Kanika died at the age of 76, on Wednesday 5 April 2000, at SSKM Hospital in Calcutta after a prolonged illness involving lung and cardiac problems. She left behind her a school of music, with numerous students, who bore the legacy of her very own stylization of Rabindrasangeet. Of her students, Rezwana Chowdhury Banya, the singer from Bangladesh, is perhaps the most well-known, for her striking similarity to Kanika's singing style. Indian Prime Minister Atal Bihari Vajpayee gave a condolence speech saying that Kanika "was among the best exponents of Rabindra Sangeet. Generations of music lovers were charmed by her golden voice."

Excerpt from obituary
In his obituary: "Nightingale of Rabindrasangeet is no more" published on 5 April 2000, Sankar Ray beautifully summarises his experience of Kanika Bandyopadhyay as a singer:

My memory takes me back to a rainy evening in 1960. All India Radio was broadcasting a programme directly from Santiniketan Ashramik Sangha. Amidst heavy rain, a melodious voice reverberated around. It was Kanika Bandyopadhyay rendering Saghana Gahana Ratri Jharichhey Shrabanadhara (heavy downpour amidst the darkness of night). I still remember the melodious voice of Mohardi as she used to be known....For those for us whose youth had been conditioned by the aesthetic and cultural traditions set out by singers like Kanika Bandyopadhyay, Debabrata Biswas, Subinoy Ray, and Rajeshwari Dutta, it is difficult to write on Mohardi. Next time when I shall go to Shantiniketan, no more shall I have the opportunity to be amidst the melodious breeze that carried her voice as often she used to sing from her house there. Farewell, Mohardi, you remain as ever-lit star in the horizon of our aesthetic sense.

Musical style
Kanika Bandyopadhyay was a contemporary of other notable exponents of Rabindrasangeet, namely Hemanta Mukhopadhyay, Chinmoy Chattopadhyay, Suchitra Mitra, Debabrata Biswas, Sagar Sen, Sumitra Sen, Rezwana Choudhury Bannya, Santidev Ghosh and Subinoy Roy. In particular, her musical style has often been compared and contrasted with that of Suchitra Mitra. While both singers excelled in songs of love and worship (puja and prem), Kanika's oeuvre was melodious yet melancholy, plaintive yet soul-stirring, whereas Suchitra was bold and strong in her renditions.

Personal life
Kanika was married in 1945 to Birendra Chandra Bandypadhyay, former deputy librarian of Viswa Bharati University and a renowned poet. The couple had no children; but later she adopted her younger sister's only son Priyom (Tanaji, the name given by Mohor di). In her later life, Kanika receded to a reclusive lifestyle and led the simple life of an ashramite in Santiniketan.

External links 

 Kanika Banerjee (Bandyopadhyay) IMDb

References

1924 births
2000 deaths
Bengali musicians
Bengali singers
Emeritus Professors in India
Indian women playback singers
Bengali playback singers
Artists from Kolkata
Performers of Hindu music
Visva-Bharati University alumni
Academic staff of Visva-Bharati University
Rabindra Sangeet exponents
20th-century Indian singers
Recipients of the Padma Shri in arts
20th-century Indian women singers
Women musicians from West Bengal
20th-century women composers
19th-century women composers
Singers from Kolkata